Born to Battle may refer to:

Born to Battle (1935 film), an American film directed by Harry S. Webb starring Tom Tyler as "Cyclone" Tom Saunders
Born to Battle (1926 film), an American film directed by Robert De Lacey starring Tom Tyler as Dennis Terhune
Born to Battle (1927 film), an American film directed by Alan James starring Bill Cody as Billy Cowan